Randy D. Dunn is an American city planner and politician. He is a former member of the Missouri House of Representatives from the 23rd District. Dunn was first elected in 2012 at the age of 29 and was re-elected to office in 2014 and 2016. Currently, he is the executive director of the Missouri Democratic Party.

Early life and career 

Dunn was born in Kansas City, Missouri on November 18, 1982, to Randy Dunn and Janice Dunn, former Democratic Committeewoman for the 18th Ward in Jackson County, Missouri. Dunn has two older brothers and three nephews. He is a distant relative of Oscar Dunn, former Lt. Governor of Louisiana and the first African American elected to statewide office in the Country.

Dunn graduated from Raytown South High School where he ran track and served on student council. In 2021 Dunn was inducted into the Raytown Alumni Hall of Fame. He received his bachelor of arts and master of public administration degrees from the University of Missouri Kansas City where he was also a United States Department of Housing and Urban Development Fellow and attended law school. In 2021 Dunn received a professional certificate in Citizen Politics in America from Harvard.

Dunn has always been active in the community and serves on numerous boards including Chair of Nu World Contemporary Danse Theatre, Kansas City Regional Transit Authority, and Freedom, Inc. Dunn is also a member of Alpha Phi Alpha fraternity. and previously served as President of the Omicron Xi Lambda chapter.

Career 

Dunn served as city planner for the city of Kansas City, Missouri from 2007 to 2012. In 2007 Dunn also obtained his real estate license and professional certificate in economic development. Additionally, Dunn is the owner and managing partner of Dean & Dunn LLC, a consulting firm based out of Kansas City. Randy previously owned and operated an online men's clothing boutique named Jet KC. Dunn also has experience working for several community and economic development corporations, working in Kansas City and Louisiana. Dunn was also elected as Vice-Chair of the Democratic Cause and Democratic Committeeman for the 2nd Ward of Jackson County, Missouri. In 2017 Dunn resigned from the Missouri Legislature to take a position in Omaha, Nebraska as founding executive director of a nonprofit community development intermediary. After moving back to Missouri Dunn came on staff for. In February 2021, Rep. Dunn was named executive director of the Missouri Democratic Party, again making histiory as the first openly gay person of color to serve in this position.

Election history 

In early 2012, Dunn announced his candidacy for the office of state representative for the 23rd District, a newly created district following redistricting. Dunn received strong community support and won the 2012 election defeating Derron Black and Erik Stafford in the August 7 primary. Dunn was unopposed in the November 6 general election and was sworn into office on January 9, 2013. Upon his election, Dunn become the first openly gay person of color elected to any office in Missouri's history.

Dunn ran for a second term in 2014. He was unopposed in the Democratic primary and the general election. Dunn was sworn into office on January 7, 2015.

Dunn was once again successful, and reelected for a third term after defeating Derron Black once more in the primary and was unopposed in the general election in November. Dunn was sworn into office on January 4, 2017.

Elections

Committee assignments

2017–2018 

Representative Dunn served on the following committees:
Elections and Elected Officials
Budget
Consent and House Procedure – (Ranking Member)
Subcommittee on Appropriations – Agriculture, Conservation, Natural Resources, and Economic Development- (Ranking Member)
Urban Economic Development – (Chair)

References 

1982 births
African-American state legislators in Missouri
LGBT state legislators in Missouri
Living people
Democratic Party members of the Missouri House of Representatives
Politicians from Kansas City, Missouri
University of Missouri–Kansas City alumni
21st-century African-American people
20th-century African-American people